Ludza (Ludza) is a town in the Latgale region of eastern Latvia. Ludza is the oldest town in Latvia and this is commemorated by a key in its coat of arms. Ludza is the administrative centre of Ludza Municipality that is located nearby the Russian border. The population as of 2020 was 7,667.

History

After Nikolay Karamzin, Ludza was first mentioned as Лючин in Hypatian Codex dating back to 1173 or 1177. In 1399 the Livonian Order built a stone fortress atop an older Latgalian fortress and used Ludza as an eastern outpost in Livonia. Ludza Castle ruins can be visited nowadays.

Polish-Lithuanian Commonwealth
After the dissolution of the Livonian Order in 1561, Ludza was incorporated to the Polish–Lithuanian Commonwealth and became part of Wenden Voivodeship. In January 1626, during the Polish-Swedish War, Ludza was captured without a battle by Sweden due to defeat of the forces of Polish-Lithuanian marshal Jan Stanisław Sapieha. Later it was recaptured by Polish forces.

In 1678, Commonwealth's Sejm appointed a special commission in Grodno that had to build Catholic churches in Latgale. Year later, a commission visited Ludza and in 1687, building of the church was completed. In 1736, church was destroyed by fire.

Russian Empire
After the first partition of Poland in 1772 was taken over by the Russian Empire and added to Vitebsk Governorate. Ludza received town rights in 1777 from Catherine II of Russia. During the first part of the 19th century, most of the population of Ludza were Jews (67% in 1815) and there were 7 synagogues in town.

Latvia
After signing of the Latvian–Soviet Peace Treaty in 1920, Ludzas apriņķis and Ludza as its administrative centre was incorporated into the Republic of Latvia.

During World War II, Ludza was under German occupation from 4 July 1941 until 23 July 1944. It was administered as a part of the Generalbezirk Lettland of Reichskommissariat Ostland. The Jewish population was restricted to a ghetto. From July 1941 until the spring of 1942, hundreds of Jews were murdered in mass executions perpetrated by Einsatzgruppen.

After Latvia regained its independence in 1991, Ludza became the administrative centre of Ludza District. On July 1, 2009, due to the introduction of the new administrative division in Latvia it became the centre of Ludza Municipality.

Tourism

Ludza Museum and Ludza Tourism Information Centre offer excursions around the town. The most visited sights are:

 Ludza History Museum and open-air exposition
 Roman Catholic Church
 Orthodox Church
 Evangelical Lutheran Church
 Old Believers' Church
 Ruins of the medieval Ludza Castle
 Ludza Craftsmen Centre

Several lakes offer fishing and water tourism possibilities.

Transport

Roads
Ludza is located on the main Riga - Moscow road, as a part of European route E22, and only 30 km away from the Latvian-Russian border.

Railway
Ludza Train Station is a part of the Rēzekne II - Zilupe railway line that was originally built in 1901 as a part of Ventspils - Moscow line. The current station building was built after the World War II.

Education

The children of Ludza may attend three pre-school educational institutions - "Rūķītis", "Pasaciņa" and "Namiņš". Elementary and secondary education curricula are provided by Ludza Gymnasium and Ludza Secondary School #2, as well as by Ludza Evening Secondary School. Additional out of school activities are offered at:

 Ludza Music Primary School (music school with integrated primary school)
 Ludza Art School
 Ludza Children and Youth Centre
 Ludza Sport School

Demographics
As of 2020, the town had a population of 7,667, of which 4,455 (58.1%) were ethnic Latvians, 2,661 (34.7%) were ethnic Russians, 168 (2.1%) were Belarusians, 93 (1.2%) were Ukrainians, 63 (0.8%) were Poles, 24 (0.3%) were Lithuanians, and 187 (2.4%) belonging to other ethnic groups.

Notable people

Born in Ludza
 Yakov Kulnev (1763–1812) – major-general, hero of the Patriotic war with Napoleon
 Ferdynand Antoni Ossendowski (1878—1945) – Polish writer and explorer
 Karol Bohdanowicz (1864–1947) – Polish geologist
 Leonid Dobychin (1894–1936) – Russian writer
 Ilya Chashnik (1902–1929) – Russian suprematist painter
 Stanislaus Ladusãns (1912-1993) - Jesuit priest

Twinning and international cooperation
Ludza municipality has several cooperation partners abroad.

 Bad Bodenteich (Germany)
 Hlybokaye (Belarus)
 Brest (Belarus)
 Nevel (Russia)
 Sebezh (Russia)
 Novopolotsk (Belarus)

See also
Ludza Estonians
Ludza castle ruins
Ludza municipality

References

External links

 Ludza Municipality portal
 Portal of Ludza Craftsmen Centre, LV, ENG, DE, RU
 The murder of the Jews of Ludza during World War II, at the Yad Vashem website

 
Towns in Latvia
1777 establishments in Europe
Castles of the Teutonic Knights
Holocaust locations in Latvia
Ludza Municipality
Lyutsinsky Uyezd
Latgale